The Monarch is a music production/songwriting duo originally from Orlando, Florida, consisting of Andre "Dre" Davidson and Sean "Sean D" Davidson. Currently residing in Los Angeles, they are best known for producing and co-writing six songs on Kelly Clarkson's Meaning of Life 2017 release, 2× platinum single "All Eyes On You" by Meek Mill and Nicki Minaj, "Take It to the Head"  by DJ Khaled, as well as How We Do (Party) by Rita Ora, and Cher Lloyd's debut single Swagger Jagger which both debuted at #1 on the UK Singles Chart  The Monarch has also produced several other songs for Justin Bieber, Robin Thicke, Chris Brown, Kevin Gates, DJ Khaled, Nicki Minaj, and Lil Wayne.

References

Record producers from Florida
Musicians from Orlando, Florida